George Mumford (1 February 1845 – 12 November 1877) was an English cricketer.

Mumford was born at Ealing in 1845 and was employed as a professional bowler by the MCC. He played regularly for the side in non first-class matches, both opening the batting and bowling. He played in four first-class cricket matches, two for MCC sides and two for Middlesex County Cricket Club. Three of these matches took place in 1867, with his final first-class match taking place in 1872.

Mumford died of tuberculosis at Ealing in 1877. He was aged 32.

References

External links

1845 births
1877 deaths
English cricketers
Middlesex cricketers
Marylebone Cricket Club cricketers
Professionals of Marylebone Cricket Club cricketers
20th-century deaths from tuberculosis
Tuberculosis deaths in England